Romeo Eugene Zondervan (born 4 March 1959) is a Dutch former professional footballer who played as a midfielder. He played his early football with FC Den Haag and FC Twente before joining West Bromwich Albion, for whom he made 84 appearances. He signed for Ipswich Town in 1984 for £70,000 and went on to make 274 appearances for the club. Then he moved to Dutch club NAC Breda in 1992 and played there until 1995, and then finished his playing career. He made one appearance for the Netherlands national team.

Club career

Dutch league clubs
Zondervan was born in Paramaribo in Suriname. He started his professional football career in The Netherlands with ADO Den Haag before moving to FC Twente.

West Bromwich Albion
Zondervan moved to England and joined former FC Twente team mate Martin Jol at West Bromwich Albion in March 1982 making his debut as a substitute against Middlesbrough. His biggest game was in his first season in the FA Cup semi-final against Queens Park Rangers which they lost 1–0.

Ipswich Town
Zondervan was "discarded" by West Bromwich Albion's new manager, Johnny Giles, and signed for Ipswich for £70,000, making his debut against Watford in March 1984. Ipswich were relegated to the Second Division in 1986 and Zondervan was named Ipswich Town F.C. Player of the Year the following year in 1987.  During the 1988–89 and 1989–90 seasons, he captained the club. His last season at Ipswich saw them win promotion to the newly formed Premier League in 1992. In an interview with The Daily Telegraph, Zondervan stated that "my football days at Ipswich were the best in my career".

Return to the Netherlands
After winning promotion with Ipswich, Zondervan was offered a five-year contract with NAC Breda where he later retired.

International career
Zondervan made 15 appearances for the Dutch Under-21s. He was selected to play for his country as part of the Dutch qualification campaign for UEFA Euro 1980.  His only appearance in the full team came in a 3–0 victory over Cyprus in February 1981.

Later career
After retiring as a player, Zondervan went on to scout in Europe for Ipswich under George Burley. He was also the agent for Collins John, whose sale from FC Twente to Fulham came under scrutiny from the Royal Dutch Football Association in 2004.  It was believed that Zondervan was not correctly registered with FIFA, but it was later determined that Zondervan was not involved in the transfer.

Personal life
Zondervan is a fully qualified pilot. He was arrested at British customs after they discovered a friend of his was carrying pornographic material from the Netherlands.  British tabloid, The Sun, referred to him as the "Porno King". He has three sons.

Honours
Ipswich Town
Football League Second Division: 1991–92

Individual
 Ipswich Town Player of the Year: 1986–87

References

External links
 Romeo Zondervan at Pride of Anglia

Living people
1959 births
Surinamese emigrants to the Netherlands
Sportspeople from Paramaribo
Dutch footballers
Association football midfielders
Netherlands international footballers
UEFA Euro 1980 players
Eredivisie players
English Football League players
West Bromwich Albion F.C. players
Ipswich Town F.C. players
ADO Den Haag players
FC Twente players
NAC Breda players
Dutch expatriate footballers
Dutch expatriate sportspeople in England
Expatriate footballers in England